Tuellen Oguta is a Kenyan football manager and former player.

Club career
Oguta played in Kenyan capital Nairobi side Gor Mahia until 1999. In the turn of the century, he moved to Kosovo, which had just become a UN protectorate a year prior after a NATO war against FR Yugoslavia (Serbia), and signed with FC Drita, thus becoming the first ever person of color to play in Kosovo. He later moved to KF Besiana where he won the Kosovar championship, Kosovar Cup and Kosovar Super Cup, all in one year. He used to play in Kosovo as left-back.

In summer 2003, President's Cup defending champions, Kenya Pipeline, have signed former Yugoslavia-based defender, Tiellen Oguta.

International career
Ogutu started appearing in the Kenyan national team still in the 1990s. He made 13 appearances between 1996 and 1999.

Coaching career
By 2014 he was assistant manager at Kenya Revenue Authority.

Honours
Besiana
 Kosovar Superliga: 2001–02
 Kosovar Cup: 2002
 Kosovar Super Cup: 2002

References

Living people
1978 births
People from Homa Bay County
Kenyan footballers
Kenya international footballers
Gor Mahia F.C. players
SoNy Sugar F.C. players
FC Drita players
FK Besiana players
Expatriate footballers in Kosovo
Association football midfielders
Association football defenders
Kenyan football managers